Starchaser may refer to:
 Starchaser: The Legend of Orin
 Starchaser, the rocket company of Steve Bennett (entrepreneur)